Primary and secondary (and occasionally tertiary) are words used by some polyamorists to distinguish between different degrees of relationship and to describe participants in those relationships (e.g. "John is my primary").

The type of entanglement/involvement described varies according to the speaker. The terms generally refer to one or more of the following:

 Emotional involvement: the intensity or depth of participants' feelings for one another.
 Logistic involvement: living and financial arrangements, shared child-rearing, etc.
 Ground rules within relationships: participants might agree that the maintenance of a particular relationship takes priority over others, making that relationship 'primary'.

(Within the "class of relationship" usage, it is not always the case that the existence of a primary relationship excludes the possibility of other primary relationships; some polyamorists consider themselves to have more than one primary relationship, perhaps along with one or more secondaries.  Some polyamorists may also consider themselves to currently have only secondary relationships, and may or may not be seeking primary relationship(s).  Within the strict "ranking" usage there can usually by definition be only one primary partner, and one secondary, etc.  Some polyamorists use a mixture of these usages - for example defining their largest involvement as "primary" by rank, while lumping all others as "secondary" by class.)

'Primary/secondary/tertiary' terminology is not universally accepted among polyamorists.  Some consider the terms (or some usages of the terms) as demeaning to 'secondaries' and 'tertiaries', or as an undesirable form of pigeonholing, and so prefer not to classify their relationships in this way.

Among those who use these terms, the issue of prescription and description arises. Most prefer to take a descriptive approach, using these terms to convey the nature of their relationships to others but not to decide the nature of those relationships. However, some also use them prescriptively. The distinction may be understood by comparing examples.  From the "class of relationship" usage:

Descriptive: "I raise children and share finances with my wife, Alice, so she is a primary partner."
Prescriptive: "Alice is my primary partner, therefore I should place my relationship with her ahead of that with Jane."

From the "ranking" usage:

Descriptive: "I have begun spending more time with Alice than with Jane, so Alice is becoming my primary partner."
Prescriptive: "Alice is my primary partner, so I should spend more time with her."

External links
 A Bouquet of Lovers – Example of prescriptive use of primary/secondary terminology
 1

Intimate relationships
Polyamorous terminology